Cochin Express is a 1967 Indian Malayalam-language thriller film, directed by M. Krishnan Nair and produced by T. E. Vasudevan. The film stars Prem Nazir, Sheela, Adoor Bhasi and Sankaradi in lead roles. The film had musical score by V. Dakshinamoorthy. The film was subsequently made in Kannada as Bangalore Mail, in Telugu as Circar Express, in Tamil as Neelagiri Express, and in Hindi as The Train.

Plot 
Prem Nazir is Police Officer Rajan who is in charge of investigating a murder that happened in 41/42 Cochin Express (present day Alappuzha-Chennai Express) from Madras to Cochin. Adoor Bhasi is Unni Kannan Nair who was a passenger in the same compartment where the murder happened and also he is the only person who saw a lady passenger that is suspected behind the murder.

Cast 
Prem Nazir as  Police Officer Rajan
Sheela as Geetha
Adoor Bhasi as Unnikannan Nair
Sankaradi as Madhava Menon
Devakibhai
GK Pillai as Hotel Manager
Kottarakkara Sreedharan Nair as Gangster
Lakshmi
A. Sakunthala
Vijayalalitha as Geetha's disguise
Prathapachandran as Police constable
Thodupuzha Radhakrishnan as Telephone caller

Soundtrack 
The music was composed by V. Dakshinamoorthy and the lyrics were written by Sreekumaran Thampi.

References

External links 
 

1967 films
1960s Malayalam-language films
Indian black-and-white films
Films set on trains
Malayalam films remade in other languages
Indian spy thriller films
Films directed by M. Krishnan Nair
1960s spy thriller films